Victor Dolipschi (19 October 1950 – 19 January 2009) was a heavyweight Greco-Roman wrestler from Romania. He won bronze medals at the 1972 and 1984 Olympics and 1972 and 1977 European championships. After retiring from competitions he joined the Romanian Wrestling Federation and eventually became its president.

References

External links
 

1950 births
2009 deaths
Olympic wrestlers of Romania
Wrestlers at the 1972 Summer Olympics
Wrestlers at the 1984 Summer Olympics
Romanian male sport wrestlers
Olympic bronze medalists for Romania
Olympic medalists in wrestling
Medalists at the 1984 Summer Olympics
Medalists at the 1972 Summer Olympics